The 3rd Hum Awards ceremony, presented by the Hum Television Network and Entertainment Channel (HTNEC), sponsored by Servis and Telenor, honored the best in fashion, music and Hum Television Dramas of 2014 and took place on 9 April 2015, at the Dubai World Trade Centre, Dubai, UAE at 8:30 p.m. UAE Standard Time and was televised on 23 May at 7:30 p.m. PST. During the ceremony, HTNEC presented Hum Awards in 25 categories along with 3 in honorary and 2 in special categories. The ceremony, televised in Pakistan by Hum TV, was produced and directed by Nazeer Saeed Janjua while executive produced by Maimona Siddiqui.

Hamza Ali Abbasi and Sanam Jung hosted the ceremony along with Vasay Chaudhry and Ahmad Ali Butt. Hamza and Ahmad hosted the ceremony for the first time, while for the third year in a row, Jung and Vasay returned as host and co-host for the ceremony, respectively. During the ceremony, Hum also held its annual Honorary Awards, which were presented by host Sanam Saeed. For the first time since its inception, the ceremony was held in Dubai because of Hum Network's completion of a 10 years and its global success. Veteran actress Atiqa Odho served as a first brand ambassador of ceremony.

Bunty I Love You won two awards including Best Drama Serial - Jury and Best Actress - Jury  by Saba Qamar. Sadqay Tumhare won the most awards with ten including  Best Drama Serial - Popular and Best Director Drama Serial for Ehteshamuddin. Other winners included Susraal Mera with three, Muhabbat Subha Ka Sitara Hai and Mausam also with two awards and Hum Tehray Gunahgaar, Uff Meri Family, and Main Kukkoo Aur Woh with one apiece.

Winners and nominees
The nominees for public voting were announced on 9 March 2015, on ceremony website. Only seven categories were set open for public voting in Viewers Choice Categories with three categories from Television and two categories from Fashion and Music segments. Voting lines were closed on 25 March 2015 for all the viewers choice categories, announcing the rest of the categories. While on 2 April 2015 the rest of nominations were announced. Sadqay Tumhare received the most nominations with fifteen total and Muhabbat Subha Ka Sitara Hai came in second with twelve.

The winners were announced during the awards ceremony on 9 April 2015. Momina Duraid consecutively won third time and total of four Best Drama Serial award as a producer. For the first time since the first ceremony, all the four acting awards went to different dramas. Sadqay Tumhare and Bunty I Love You became the only dramas that were nominated before the completion of their broadcast, ultimately winning Best Drama serial - Popular and Best Drama Serial - Jury respectively. For the third in a row ceremony had a tie with the respective wins of Danish Taimoor and Imran Aslam for Hum Tehray Gunahgaar and Susraal Mera respectively in Best Soap Actor category. Khalil-ur-Rehman Qamar became the first male person to win the Best Writer Drama Serial award. Momina Duraid with four, Mahira Khan, and Samiya Mumtaz and Adnan Malik with two each, were the only individuals to win multiple trophies.

Winners are listed first and highlighted in boldface.

Television

Music

Fashion

Honorary Hum Awards 

Hosted by Sanam Saeed, Hum presented following annual honorary awards during the ceremony:

Lifetime Achievement Award 
 Anwar Maqsood

Hum Honorary Award in Music  
 Abida Parveen

Hum Honorary Award in Television  
 Samina Peerzada

International Icon of the Year  
 Fawad Khan

Hum Honorary Special Recognition  
 Nabeel Qureshi and Fizza Ali Meerza - Na Maloom Afraad

Dramas with multiple nominations and awards 

The following 17 Dramas received multiple nominations:

The following Five dramas received multiple awards:

Presenters and performers 
The following individuals, listed in order of appearance, presented awards or performed musical numbers.

Presenters

Performers

Ceremony information 
With two successful years of previous year ceremonies which garnered the channel critical and positive reception, the Hum rehired producer and director Nazeer Saeed Janjua for the third consecutive year. In February 2015, the Hum actors Hamza Ali Abbasi and sanam Jung were chosen as host for 2015 gala. While hosts Vasay Chaudhry and Ahmad Ali Butt were hired for co-hosting the ceremony, with Sanam Saeed as a host of Hum Honorary Awards. Jung returned for third time to host the ceremony, who previously co-hosted the Hum Awards in 2012 and 2013. Vasay also marked his third entrance as a co-host and writer of ceremony. Actors Hamza and Butt hosted the ceremony for the first time. 
  
Special half-hour programs of making ceremony and rehearsals were broadcast and televised simultaneously Television personality Anoushey Ashraf returned to host the shows with Mohsin Abbas Haider who hosted the programs for the first time. During the programs, host usually interacts with the actors and management team working behind the curtain, revealing their efforts and work. Also the rehearsals, production design, art design, set decoration and several others managements are shown. On 3 April 2015, Hum organised the pre-awards part for all the nominees. 
 
Several other people were also involved with the production of the ceremony. Rehan Ahmed and Fahad Buksh served as a directors of Red Carpet and Making of ceremony. Production 021 returned to design a new set and stage design for the show with Saad Qazi and Nasir Jamal holding the operations in Dubai. Make-up and styling was done by the Nabeela of N-pro. Performances were choreographed by BNF Dance & Entertainment. During the ceremony a special award was presented to Fawad Khan for his contribution to cinema.

Broadcast, venue and voting of ceremony 
Hum Network organized the event off-air on 9 April 2015 and premiered on Hum TV on 23 and 24 May 2015 as Part I and Part II respectively. The ceremony was televised again on 25 July 2015. Hum Television Network and Entertainment Channel organize the third year ceremony in Dubai at World Trade Center as a part of Network's ten years success and global achievements. At press release Atiqa Odho the brand ambassador of ceremony said; "It’s a proud moment for all of us... Our Pakistani dramas have stayed honest to our culture and are close to reality. Lots of people, even if they don’t live in Pakistan, feel a cultural connect. They feel that it could be a story of their homes ... After all, our family values are the same. We are extremely brave when it comes to our content. We don’t show you just glamour. We will put up a mirror and show you reality." Seven Viewers Choice categories from Television, Music and Fashion were opened for voting on ceremony website and were announced on the basis of highest public votes given to an individual in each category. Jury choice categories were completely based on the Hum membership's voting as a whole.

The Best Short Film / Video Category, Middle East
Since the ceremony's host country held as Dubai, Hum Network announced a special category for the filmmakers working in Middle East. During the ceremony Hum Network and Entertainment channel presented The Best Short Film - Middle East award. Nominations were made on the basis of Short Films submitted online to Hum TV by directors themselves. Six short films were listed as final nominee for the category, namely, Faraz Waqar for 9:11 am Oliver Obaid for All in time, Mustafa Abbas for Sunset State, Tanveer Syed for Toast to a Ghost, Tabarak Rizvi for Faded  and Farhan Abbas for Thora Sa Waqt with Abu Dhabi-based Pakistani filmmaker Faraz Waqar won the award for the Best Short Film 9:11 am. Faraz submitted three short films for the nominations including 9:11 am and critically acclaimed Pakistan's first silent film Meeoww Billi Aur World War 3 and Imagineer who was a tribute to Nations' pop singer Nazia Hassan. However 9:11 am got selected and ultimately won the award. The film was the graduation thesis project of director made in 2012.

Special, newly awarded and not-awarded categories 
Following the previous year ceremony Hum TV presented Hum Honorary Special Recognition Award to producer Fizza Ali Meerza and Nabeel Qureshi for their film Na Maloom Afraad, a joint production of Hum Films and Filmwala Pictures for its box office and commercial success. Special Launch and  screening of Momina Duraid's film Bin Roye was also held. Which is the first own production of channels subsidiary Hum Films. In award categories, Hum Award for Best Designer Menswear, Hum Award for Best Designer Womenswear, Hum Award for Best Solo Artist and Best Onscreen Couple Popular were not awarded, while categories Best Drama Series, Best Television Host and Best Comic Actor were not awarded after being presented at first ceremony, but their discontinuation is yet to be confirmed. However, only one category, Best Music Single was introduced at the ceremony in music section.

Critical reception 
The show received a mixed reception from media publications. Most media outlets overseen the ceremony as a positive step in encouraging talent in Pakistan and praised it progress and achievements in a time period of just three years. Media Poondi wrote that, "For an award ceremony to cross the international border in its 3rd year where many other award shows of this age struggle with teething issues was a mammoth task which HUM Network was able to pull off owing to its worldwide popularity." Hamna Zubair of Dawn.com commented, "the event held the promise of being a real entertainer, which it fulfilled." Despite the ceremony started two and half-hours late, she explained that, "It was well organised, with only a few moments where someone would walk on to the stage a bit late, or a microphone would stop working for a few seconds. Once the show began, it ran smoothly." Television critic Fatima Awan of Review.it quipped, "Hamza Ali Abbasi and Sanam Jung were confident hosts and they did their job well but they were obviously expected to stick to the script." In addition she observed and criticized the usage of Indian songs for performances but praised the choreography, the set decoration and script of ceremony, Awan ended by saying that, "Overall, the HUM Awards were a labour of love; very well put together indeed but next time we would all like to see Pakistani music being promoted on this forum since these awards pay tribute to everything that is Pakistani. The day that happens it will be a very proud moment for all of us…..what better way to say 'Pakistan Zindabad!'" 

Emanuel Sarfraz from The Nation  also lauded the ceremony by saying, "The event also marked the 10th Anniversary of HUM Network. The honour goes to HUM for holding first awards of a Pakistani TV channel to be held outside the country. It must have been a mammoth task which it was able to pull off owing to its worldwide popularity. It was one of the most organised events that this scribe has seen. Hats off to team HUM." The writer and reviewer Sadaf Haider of Dawn News also favored the Hum Awards commenting, "this year's HUM TV awards, aired in full on the TV channel this weekend, showed an unprecedented level of organization and high production values from dances to lighting and sets." but she slated the length of ceremony and compared Lux Style Awards and ARY Film Awards with the event. She concluded with remarking that, "overall, the HUM TV awards made for great viewing and will probably only improve with time."

See also

 14th Lux Style Awards

Notes
 A: When the nominations were announced Digest Writer and Sadqay Tumharay were still airing on TV and completed their broadcast on 14 March – 10 April 2015 respectively. The serials eventually became the most awarded drama serials of the ceremony.

References

External links

Official websites
 Hum Awards official website
 Hum Awards at Hum Network Limited 
 Hum Television Network and Entertainment Channel (HTNEC)
  (run by the Hum Television Network and Entertainment Channel)

News Resources
 Hum Awards 2015 BBC Urdu 
 3rd Hum Awards Khaleej Times

Analysis
 2014 Hum Awards: What Went down Dawn News
 Hum Awards Winners, PAK: 2015 Desi Blitz

Other resources
 3rd HUM TV Awards 2015 Winners In Drama, Fashion & Music Pakistaniyan

2014 television awards
2014 music awards
Hum Awards
Hum Award winners
Hum Awards ceremonies
Events in Dubai